The Pic de Vallibierna, culminating at , together with the tuc Culebras  forms a massif located south of the massif de la Maladeta, in the Spanish Pyrenees (Aragon province). The crest separating both summits is nicknamed the horse step.

References

Mountains of the Pyrenees
Mountains of Aragon
Pyrenean three-thousanders